RockLive is an American online social network and games developer that was founded in 2009.

In 2013, RockLive became Shots Studios, a digital studio and management company which also released the Shots App, a comedy social network for millennials.

RockLive developed mobile games in partnership with athletes, including Mike Tyson, Cristiano Ronaldo and Usain Bolt.

References

External links
 

Video game companies of the United States